Yannic Lemmen (born 19 April 1995) is a German male canoeist who won two medals at senior level at the Wildwater Canoeing World Championships.

Medals at the World Championships
Senior

References

External links
 

1995 births
Living people
German male canoeists
Place of birth missing (living people)